King County was one of the original Nineteen Counties in New South Wales and is now one of the 141 cadastral divisions of New South Wales. It is in the area to the east of Yass. The northern part of it lies between the Lachlan River and the Boorowa River, including the locations of Frogmore, Taylors Flat, Gunnary, Rugby and Rye Park. The Crookwell River is also part of the northern boundary. The Yass River is the southern boundary.

King County was named in honour of Governor Philip Gidley King (1758-1808).

Parishes within this county
A full list of parishes found within this county; their current LGA and mapping coordinates to the approximate centre of each location is as follows:

References

Counties of New South Wales